Cold Blue is the debut full-length album by the hardcore punk band the Hope Conspiracy, released in 2000.

Critical reception
Exclaim! wrote: "Of course, the up-tempo hardcore-inflected riffs are present, as are the prerequisite breakdowns, thrash inspired metallic segments and tortured spoken/screamed vocals, but the Hope Conspiracy does manage a somewhat fresh take on it - the enthusiasm is tangible, the execution is flawless and the lyrics of singer Kevin Baker are more poetic than preaching."

Track listing

References

External links
 Equal Vision Album Page

2000 debut albums
Equal Vision Records albums
The Hope Conspiracy albums
Albums with cover art by Jacob Bannon
Albums produced by Kurt Ballou